The A-350 GRAU 5V61 (NATO reporting name ABM-1 Galosh, formerly SH-01) was a Soviet, nuclear armed surface-to-air anti-ballistic missile.  The A-350 was a component of the A-35 anti-ballistic missile system. Its primary mission was to destroy U.S. Minuteman and Titan intercontinental ballistic missiles targeting Moscow.

The A-350 was introduced during the 1960s with mechanically steered semi-active radar guidance. It contained a high-yield nuclear warhead, comparable to the U.S. Nike Zeus.

The A-350R (NATO reporting name ABM-1B) was introduced with the advanced A-35M missile system and became operational during 1978. This system was tested at the Sary Shagan Launch Facility with five test flights during 1971, 1976, and 1977, with two more tests during 1993 and 1999.<ref name=A35M>{{cite web|url=http://www.astronautix.com/s/saryshagan.html|archive-url=https://web.archive.org/web/20161227211415/http://astronautix.com/s/saryshagan.html|url-status=dead|archive-date=27 December 2016|title=Astronautix: Sary Shagan|access-date=26 October 2020}}</ref>

The next generation of missiles, introduced with the A-135 ABM System, were the 53T6 (1970s) and the 51T6 (1980s).

Design

The A-350 was a three-stage solid-fueled design with a range of over 300 kilometers.
It was improved with a restartable liquid-fueled third stage.
This gave a much improved post-launch and re-targeting capabilities.
The A-350 are launched from above-ground launchers.

The missile design was done by MKB Fakel's Chief Designer Petr Grushin.

The system had multiple radars during the different phases including the Don-2N radar and Dnestr radar early warning systems, and the Dunay radar target acquisition systems. The A-35 with radar was designed by Chief Designer K. B. Kisunko.

Radar systems
The idea for this system was to protect Moscow from nuclear attack by the United States. The Russian government began studies during 1958 with preliminary designs from General Designer K. B. Kisunko. Further designs and development were moved to TsNPO Vympel.
Radar systems were tested with Duna-3 single direction search radar and the Dunay-3U omni-direction 360-degree search radar, designed by V. P. Sosulnikov and A. N. Musatov, respectively. A more advanced system of radars were included, the Don-2N System; consisting of the 6000 km long-range early warning radars Don-2N and Dnestr, (NATO code names Pill Box and Hen House), and the 2800 km short-range target acquisition radars Dunay-3M and Dunay-3U (NATO codenames Dog House and Cat House).

Missile warhead
The A-350 developed through a period of growth and modifications. Configurations included an improved A-350Zh with tests during 1973. Eventually, the design changed again with radiation-hardened cases and became the A-350R for Phase 2 deployment in 1974.

Construction

The construction of the A-35 system began during 1962 with 16 primary sites including command post, radar installations and firing complexes for 8–16 missile launchers.  Some of the existing sites of the old S-25 Berkut were modified. Some known locations are: Naro-Fominsk, Olenegorsk, Skrunda, Angarsk, Nikolaeyev, and Sary Shagan.

One of the Dunay radar (NATO Code : Dog House'') phased array radar systems was located at Naro-Fominsk. This system is comparable to the US's PAVE PAWS radars of the Sentinel and Safeguard ABM programs.

The construction plan changed a number of times, varying the locations, sectors or quadrants, and number of launchers.  The system finalized at 8 sites with total of 64 launchers, with 4 major radar centers completed.

Advanced A-35M system (ABM-1B)

With on-going advancements in the ABM system, radars, missile and warheads, the evolution of the A-35 became the A-35M.  The "M" for modernization, was brought on through the advanced developments at 10 different Russian institutes. One primary upgrade was in the Dunay-3U radar systems enhanced with a dedicated sector search functionality.  Along with other upgrades, actual air tests were performed with different configurations between 1976 and 1977.  Phase 3 of the A-35M went on-line in 1978.

See also

List of missiles
Treaties
Strategic Defense Initiative
Strategic Arms Limitation Talks
Anti-Ballistic Missile Treaty

Related US missiles
Nike Zeus
Sprint (missile)
LIM-49A Spartan

References

Notes

 Secret Projects: ABM-1 Specifications
 Astronautix: Russian SAMs and ABMs

External links
 Secret Projects: Russian ABM system
 AeroSpaceWEb: ABMs
 ABM-1 Galosh and A-35 site photos scroll down
 NATO Soviet Naming Conventions for ABMs
 FAS.org: ABM-2

Anti-ballistic missiles of the Soviet Union
Cold War surface-to-air missiles of the Soviet Union
Cold War military equipment of the Soviet Union
Science and technology in the Soviet Union
A-350
Missile defense
A-350
Almaz-Antey products
Vympel NPO products
Anti-ballistic missiles of Russia
Nuclear anti-aircraft weapons
Military equipment introduced in the 1960s